The 2017 KW Fall Classic was held from September 21 to 24 at the Kitchener-Waterloo Granite Club in Waterloo, Ontario as part of the 2017-18 World Curling Tour. The men's event was a triple knockout format, while the women's event was held in a round robin format.

Men

Teams

Knockout results
The draw is listed as follows:

A event

B event

C event

Playoffs

Women

Teams

Round Robin Standings

Playoffs

References

External links

2017 in Canadian curling
Sport in Waterloo, Ontario
Curling in Ontario
2017 in Ontario